Trouble is the fourth studio album by American doom metal band Trouble, released on Def American on February 13, 1990. It was the first Trouble album to have Barry Stern on drums. Music videos were made for "At the End of My Daze," "Psychotic Reaction," "R.I.P.," and "The Misery Shows (Act II);" the music videos were released on the Videos DVD by the band's Trouble, Inc. label in 2007. The album was reissued and remastered by Hammerheart Records, cooperating alongside Trouble, Inc., on November 27, 2020.

Track listing

Personnel
Trouble
Eric Wagner – vocals
Bruce Franklin – guitars
Rick Wartell – guitars
Ron Holzner – bass
Barry Stern – drums

Additional musicians
Jeff Olson – keyboards

Production
Rick Rubin – producer
David Bianco, Jimmy Heyson – engineers
Brian Jenkins – assistant engineer
Maria DeGrassi – art direction, design
Paul Natkin – front cover photography
David Skernick – back cover photography
Timothy Eames – logo sculpture
Adam Dubin – music videos director for "At the End of My Daze" and "R.I.P."
Danny Cornyetz – music videos editor
Dave Kaplan – manager
Greg Fulginiti – mastering at Artisan Sound Recorders in Los Angeles, California (original version)
Erwin Hermsen – remastering at Toneshed Recording Studio in The Netherlands (2020 version)

References

Trouble (band) albums
1990 albums
Albums produced by Rick Rubin
American Recordings (record label) albums